The 2015 Oceania Women's Sevens Championship was the fifth Oceania Women's Sevens tournament. It was held in Auckland, New Zealand on 14–15 November 2015. As well as determining the regional championship, the tournament was also a qualifying event for the 2016 Olympics sevens, with the highest-placed eligible team not already qualified gaining a direct berth to Rio de Janeiro. 

Fiji won the tournament, defeating Samoa 55–0 in the final. The second and third place getters Samoa and the Cook Islands received invitations to the final qualification tournament. Australia and New Zealand did not participate in the 2015 Oceania Women's Sevens as they had already qualified for the 2016 Olympics.

Teams
Participating nations for the 2015 tournament are:

Pool stage

Knockout stage

Final standings

See also
 Oceania Women's Sevens Championship

References

2015
2015 in New Zealand rugby union
2015 rugby sevens competitions
2015 in women's rugby union
Rugby sevens competitions in New Zealand
International rugby union competitions hosted by New Zealand